PAOK (Πανθεσσαλονίκειος Αθλητικός Όμιλος Κωνσταντινοπολιτών, Panthessalonikeios Athlitikós Ómilos Constantinopoliton, Pan-Thessalonian Athletic Club of Constantinopolitans), commonly known as A.C. PAOK, is a major multi-sports club based in Thessaloniki, Macedonia, Greece. The club has several departments, including football, basketball, volleyball, handball, water polo, swimming, wrestling, ice hockey, and weightlifting. P.A.O.K was founded in April 1926.  Because of its crest, it is also known as the "Double-Headed Eagle of the North", in contrast with AEK, the "Double-Headed Eagle of the South". They are one of the most popular Greek sports-clubs with many fans all over the country (mostly, but not exclusively, in Northern Greece), and also among the Greek diaspora.

History

PAOK is closely linked with Hermes Sports Club, which was formed in 1875 by the Greek community of Pera, a district of Constantinople (Istanbul). The club was founded in April 1926 by Constantinopolitans who fled to Thessaloniki after the Greek defeat in the Greco-Turkish War (see Rum Millet).

The club's first memorandum of association was approved on 20 April 1926 by a decision of the Thessaloniki Court of First Instance (No. 822). The founding members were A. Angelopoulos, A. Athanasiadis, K. Anagnostidis, M. Ventourellis, F. Vyzantinos, V.Karapiperis, A. Dimitriadis, D. Dimitriadis, N. Zoumboulidis, M. Theodosiadis, T. Ioakimopoulos, P. Kalpaktsoglou, T. Kartsambekis, D. Koemtzopoulos, K. Koemtzopoulos, P. Kontopoulos, K. Kritikos, M. Konstantinidis, P. Maleskas, I. Nikolaidis, L. Papadopoulos, F. Samantzopoulos, T. Tsoulkas, M. Tsoulkas, S. Triantafyllidis and T. Triantafyllidis (who was also its first Chairman).

P.A.O.K.'s first Board of Directors, serving between 1926 and 1927, consisted of:

 T. Triantafyllidis (President)
 P. Kalpaktsoglou (1st vice-president)
 K. Kritikos (General Secretary)
 M. Tsoulkas (Special Secretary)
 T. Ioakimopoulos (Treasurer)
 A. Angelopoulos (Director of Football)
 A. Dimitriadis (Director of Sports)
 P. Maleskas (Consultant)
 K. Koemtzopoulos (Consultant)
 M. Theodosiadis (Consultant)

The club's policy was to be open to every citizen of Thessaloniki, leading to a minor rivalry with AEK Thessaloniki, the other Constantinopolitan team of the city, in which only refugees were allowed to play. The original logo of PAOK was a horseshoe and a four-leaf clover. The leaves were green and above them were the initials of the word PAOK. Kostas Koemtzopoulos, one of PAOK's founding members, came up with this idea, inspired by his favourite brand of cigarettes.

The football club played their first game (friendly) on 4 May 1926, at Thermaikos stadium, defeating Megas Alexandros Thessaloniki 2–1. The first coach of the club was Kostas Andreadis, who spent five years on the bench without demanding any payment. Their first captain was Michalis Ventourelis.

The first professional contract was signed by the club on 5 September 1928. The contract stipulated that the French footballer Raymond Etienne  – of Jewish descent from Pera Club – would be paid 4,000 drachmas per month. The contract was signed by Dr. Meletiou, the PAOK chairman, and Mr. Sakellaropoulos, the Hon. Secretary.

In early 1929, AEK Thessaloniki was virtually dissolved and absorbed by PAOK. PAOK thereupon changed their emblem, adopting the double-headed eagle, as a symbol of the club's Byzantine/Constantinopolitan heritage. PAOK also got possession of AEK's facilities located around Syntrivani (i.e. Fountain) Square.

In 1937, PAOK won his first title, the Macedonia (EPSM or Thessaloniki) Championship, and participated in the Panhellenic Championship, finishing second. The 1937 team included: Sotiriadis, Vatikis, Goulios, Kontopoulos, Bostantzoglou, Panidis, Glaros, Kritas, Ioannidis, Kalogiannis, Koukoulas, Kosmidis, Apostolou, Vafiadis, Vasiliadis, Anastasiadis, Moschidis, Tzakatzoglou, Zakapidas.

The first Greek championship for the basketball team was achieved in 1958–59 season. The first Greek championship for the football team was achieved in 1975–76 season.

In the 90s, the basketball team won another Greek championship and two European cups, the 1990–91 FIBA European Cup Winners' Cup and the 1993–94 FIBA Korać Cup.

Crest and Colours

The original logo of PAOK was a horseshoe and a four-leaf clover. The current symbol since 1929 is the double-headed eagle. The eagle symbolizes the origins of the club in the former Byzantine capital, Constantinople, and the legacy of the Greek refugees from Asia Minor, Eastern Thrace, Pontus and Caucasus. In 2013, a golden outline was added to the football team's crest, as a symbol of the club's Byzantine heritage.

The club's traditional colours are black, as sadness for the Asia Minor Catastrophe of 1922 and the end of the Greek presence in Anatolia, and white as hope for recovery.

Supporters
P.A.O.K. is the most widely supported sports-club in Northern Greece and one of the 4 most popular in the country (along with the big-three of capital Athens and Piraeus). PAOK's traditional fanbase comes from the city of Thessaloniki, where the club is based, as well as from the rest of Macedonia region and Northern Greece. They also have fans all over the country and in the Greek Diaspora (Germany, Australia, USA, etc.).

Rivalries

P.A.O.K.'s main rivals are Olympiacos, Aris (local rivals), Panathinaikos, AEK, Iraklis.

Football kit evolution

First

Alternative

P.A.O.K. Departments – Honours

Football

Men's Football
Greek Championships 3: 1976, 1985, 2019
Greek Cups 8: 1972, 1974, 2001, 2003, 2017, 2018, 2019, 2021
Greater Greece Cup 1: 1973

Women's Football
Greek Women's Championship: 17 (record): 2002, 2006, 2007, 2008, 2009, 2010, 2011, 2012, 2013, 2015, 2016, 2017, 2018, 2019, 2020, 2021, 2022Greek Women's Cup: 6 (record): 2002, 2013, 2014, 2015, 2016, 2017Men's BasketballGreek Championships: 2 1959, 1992Greek Cups: 3 1984, 1995, 1999Cup Winners' Cup: 11991Korać Cup: 11994Men's VolleyballGreek Championship: 3 2015, 2016, 2017Greek Cup: 4  2015, 2018, 2019, 2022Women's VolleyballGreek Cup: 1  2021Men's HandballGreek Championships: 32009, 2010, 2015Greek Cups: 3 2012, 2015, 2017Greek beach handball championship: 1 2001Women's HandballGreek Championship: 52013, 2019, 2020, 2021, 2022Greek Cup: 62014, 2016, 2019, 2020, 2021, 2022 Weightlifting 5 Greek men's Championship: 2006, 2017, 2019, 2021, 2022 Wrestling 6 Greek men's Championship Greco-Roman: 2017, 2018, 2019, 2020, 2021, 2022 Judo 
 2 Greek men's/women's Championship: 2019, 2022 Athletics 3 Greek women's Open Athletics Championship: 1976, 1977, 19822 Greek women's Cross Country Championships: 1968, 1974Swimming1 Greek OPEN Championship: 1987Cycling1 Greek men's Championship Mountain Bike: 2002Boxing2 Greek men's Championship: 2003, 2007 Roller hockey 1 Greek men's Championship: 20081 Balkan Cup: 2007' European honours 

Notable former athletes
 Football: Men: Giorgos Koudas, Stavros Sarafis, Konstantinos Iosifidis, Christos Terzanidis, Angelos Anastasiadis, Giorgos Skartados, Giorgos Kostikos, Thodoris Zagorakis, Zisis Vryzas, Georgios Georgiadis, Pablo Gabriel García, Lino, Sérgio Conceição, Vieirinha, Dimitar Berbatov, Aleksandar Prijović, Lucas Pérez, Magdy Tolba, Hossam Hassan, Percy Olivares, Dimitris Paridis, Giannis Gounaris, Filotas Pellios, Neto Guerino, Ioannis Damanakis, Nikos Alavantas, Christos Dimopoulos, Giorgos Toursounidis, Kostas Frantzeskos, Omari Tetradze, Pantelis Kafes, Stelios Venetidis, Ioannis Okkas, Panayiotis Engomitis, Pablo Contreras, Zlatan Muslimović   Women: Natalia Chatzigiannidou, Jelena Dimitrijević, Dimitra Panteliadou
 Basketball: Men: Bane Prelević, John Korfas, Peja Stojaković, Scott Skiles, Walter Berry, Ken Barlow, Cliff Levingston, Nikos Boudouris, Giorgos Balogiannis, Efthimios Rentzias, Giannis Giannoulis, Kostas Vasileiadis, Zoran Savić, Anthony Bonner, Frankie King, Claudio Coldebella, Manthos Katsoulis, Nikos Stavropoulos, Vangelis Alexandris, Panagiotis Fasoulas, Rasho Nesterovic, İbrahim Kutluay, Damir Mulaomerović, Dejan Tomašević
 Volleyball: Men: Dante Amaral, Ernardo Gómez, Alexander Shafranovich, Rolando Cepeda, Javier Jiménez, David Lee, Giannis Pantakidis, Giannis Kalmazidis, Vasileios Kournetas, Vladimir Grbić, Kevin Hansen, Matti Hietanen, Plamen Konstantinov, Paul Lotman, Olli-Pekka Ojansivu, Evan Patak, Vlado Petković, Konstantinos Prousalis, Clayton Stanley, Riley Salmon, Nikolaos Smaragdis, Saša Starović, Mitar Tzourits, Nikolay Uchikov, Ronald Zoodsma
 Athletics: Men: Michalis Akritidis, Themistoklis Akritidis, Dimitrios Kokotis, Konstantinos Koukodimos, Dimitrios Koutsoukis Women: Vasiliki Anastasiou, Xanthipi Koukoumaka, Voula Patoulidou
 Swimming: Men: Christos Papadopoulos Women'': Kalliopi Araouzou, Antonia Machaira, Aikaterini Sarakatsani, Katerina Stikoudi, Aikaterini Klepkou, Anna Ntountounaki.

PAOK Presidents

Notable supporters

Giannis Aggelakas, musician
Paola Foka, singer
Frangoulis Frangos, military officer
Stratos Dionysiou, singer
Stavros Kalafatis, politician, MP
Vasilis Karras, singer
Anna Korakaki, shooter
Dimitris Lyacos, writer
Manos Loizos, composer
Giorgos Mavridis, TV presenter
Manolis Mitsias, singer
Apostolos Nikolaidis (singer)
Nikos Papazoglou, singer
Dionysis Savvopoulos, musician
Giannis Servetas, actor
Katerina Stikoudi, model

Sakis Tanimanidis, TV producer
Georgios Themelis, politician
Euclid Tsakalotos, economist, former minister of Finance
Popi Tsapanidou, journalist
Kyriakos Velopoulos, politician, leader of the party Greek Solution
Christos Zabounis, editor
Konstantinos Zervas, politician, mayor of Thessaloniki
Kostas Zouraris, political scientist

Gallery

References

External links
 

Multi-sport clubs in Thessaloniki
 
Sport in Thessaloniki